Pierre Gosselin (born 23 March 1932) is a Belgian cyclist. He competed in the men's tandem event at the 1952 Summer Olympics.

References

External links

1932 births
Living people
Belgian male cyclists
Olympic cyclists of Belgium
Cyclists at the 1952 Summer Olympics
Cyclists from Hainaut (province)
People from Saint-Ghislain